Ernest Robertovich Yahin (born  in Ufa) is a Russian Nordic combined skier.

Career
Yahin competed at the 2014 Winter Olympics for Russia. He placed 9th as a member of the Nordic Combined team event.

As of September 2014, his best showing at the World Championships is 12th, in the 2013 team event. His best individual finish is 41st, in the 2013 large hill event.

Yahin made his World Cup debut in January 2012. As of September 2014, his best finish is 8th, in a pair of team events. His best individual finish is 33rd, in a pair of large hill events in 2011–12.

References

External links

1991 births
Living people
Sportspeople from Ufa
Olympic Nordic combined skiers of Russia
Nordic combined skiers at the 2014 Winter Olympics
Nordic combined skiers at the 2018 Winter Olympics
Russian male Nordic combined skiers
Universiade medalists in nordic combined
Universiade bronze medalists for Russia
Competitors at the 2015 Winter Universiade